The Laughing Apple is the fifteenth studio album by Yusuf / Cat Stevens. The album was released on 15 September 2017 by Cat-O-Log Records. It is Yusuf's fourth mainstream release since his return to music and his first since 2014's acclaimed Tell 'Em I'm Gone. The album was produced by Yusuf / Cat Stevens & Paul Samwell-Smith. Its title is a reference to one of Cat Stevens' earlier hits, "The Laughing Apple" that was included in his 1967 album New Masters. It would be the first album with his former name (Cat Stevens) included on an album since his Back to Earth album, released in 1978.  It was nominated for the Grammy Award for Best Folk Album.

Background
On 21 July 2017, Yusuf / Cat Stevens announced the forthcoming release on 15 September 2017 of his new studio album The Laughing Apple.

Track listing
Source:

Charts

References

External links
Official site

2017 albums
Cat Stevens albums
Yusuf Islam albums